The 2020 United States presidential election in Indiana was held on Tuesday, November 3, 2020, as part of the 2020 United States presidential election in which all 50 states plus the District of Columbia participated. Indiana voters chose electors to represent them in the Electoral College via a popular vote, pitting the Republican Party's nominee, incumbent President Donald Trump, and running mate Vice President Mike Pence against Democratic Party nominee, former Vice President Joe Biden, and his running mate California Senator Kamala Harris. Indiana has 11 electoral votes in the Electoral College.

Indiana was the home state of Pence, who served as Governor of Indiana from 2013 to 2017. Pence retained a 59% approval among voters in his home state.

On the day of the election, most news organizations considered Indiana a state Trump would win, or a likely red state. Trump won Indiana by 57% to Biden's 41%, a slight increase in his vote share from 2016, but a reduction in his margin of victory. This election marked the first time since 1952 and only the third time since 1888 that Vigo County, home to Terre Haute and a significant bellwether county, voted for the losing candidate in a presidential election. Biden subsequently became the first presidential nominee of either party since Dwight D. Eisenhower in 1952, and the first Democrat since Grover Cleveland in 1884, to win without carrying Vigo County. Biden also became the first Democrat since FDR in 1944 to win without carrying traditionally Democratic Perry County in Southern Indiana. Biden did flip Tippecanoe County, home to Lafayette, from Republican to Democratic, marking the first time since 1936 that the county voted against Indiana's statewide winner. Trump also became the first Republican since Ronald Reagan in 1984 to carry exurban Madison County with more than 60% of the vote.

Notably, Biden reduced the Republican margin in Hamilton County, a suburban county in the Indianapolis metropolitan area that is the state's fourth-most populous county. Hamilton County has never supported a candidate of the Democratic Party for president except for 1912, when the split in the Republicans allowed Woodrow Wilson to carry the county with a 34.9% plurality. Hamilton broke 60%-38% for John McCain in 2008, when Barack Obama won Indiana. Mitt Romney won Hamilton County 66%–32% in 2012 and Trump won it 56%-37% in 2016, nearly identical to his statewide margin. In this election, Trump narrowly won Hamilton County, 52%-45%, a margin that is to the left of the statewide result. Biden's 45% vote share in Hamilton County is higher than that of even Lyndon B. Johnson in his nationwide landslide in 1964 and higher than that of Franklin D. Roosevelt in 1936. Biden's vote share in Hamilton is only equaled by Roosevelt's 44.85% share in his 1932 landslide.

Primary elections
The primary elections were held on June 2, 2020.

Republican primary
Donald Trump won the Republican primary, and received all of the state's 58 delegates to the 2020 Republican National Convention.

Democratic primary

Libertarian nominee
The 2020 Libertarian National Convention was held on May 22–24, 2020, selecting Jo Jorgensen, Psychology Senior Lecturer at Clemson University, as their presidential nominee.

Green primary
The Green primary was held on May 1–31, 2020, with mail-in ballots being post marked no later than June 1, 2020, and results being published by June 14, 2020.

General election

Predictions

Polling

Graphical summary

Aggregate polls

Polls

Donald Trump vs. Elizabeth Warren

Results

Statewide results

Results by county

Counties that flipped from Republican to Democratic
Tippecanoe (largest municipality: Lafayette)

Results by congressional district

Trump and Republican candidates won 7 of 9 congressional districts.

See also
 United States presidential elections in Indiana
 2020 Indiana elections
 2020 United States presidential election
 2020 Democratic Party presidential primaries
 2020 Republican Party presidential primaries
 2020 Libertarian Party presidential primaries
 2020 United States elections

Notes

Partisan clients

References

Further reading
 
 . (Describes bellwether Vigo County, Indiana)

External links
 
 
  (State affiliate of the U.S. League of Women Voters)
 

Indiana
2020
Presidential